Eden Gaha is an Australian producer based in Los Angeles. He is currently President of Shine America.

Early life
Eden Gaha was born in Sydney and attended Newington College.

Career
From 1985 to 1986, Eden Gaha featured as singer dancer in the inaugural run of the Solid Gold show at Gold Nugget Theatre, Australia's Wonderland.

Gaha made his screen acting debut in 1989 in the Australian drama series A Country Practice and subsequently had roles in Home and Away, G.P. and Police Rescue.

In 1992 Gaha hosted teen game show Vidiot for Australian public broadcaster ABC.

In 1996 he became a presenter on Channel 9's Animal Hospital, where he started producing his own stories. Gaha worked on Animal Hospital for four years.<ref name="reveille"></</ref>

In 1999 Gaha received a Centenary of Federation grant to produce the documentary The Ties that Bind; subsequently, a series of six half-hour documentaries was completed where prominent Australians of ethnic parents travel back to the birthplace of their ancestors. Each documentary is a personal journey of discovery to find what it means to be Australian.

In 2003 Gaha began working on Survivor (US) as Supervising Producer alongside Mark Burnett where he was nominated twice for the primetime Emmy award. With Burnett he worked as co-executive producer on The Apprentice, The Contender, Pirate Master, and Rock Star. He completed his fifth season of Celebrity Apprentice as executive producer.

On 6 May 2011 it was announced that Gaha would be taking over the presidency of Reveille Productions from June 2011. In March 2012, Reveille became known as Shine America.

At Shine America, Gaha executive produced Masterchef, Junior Masterchef, Riot (hosted by fellow Australian compatriot Rove McManus and co-executive produced by Steve Carell), Restaurant Startup and The Biggest Loser. On 24 September 2014 it was announced that Gaha would co-produce Aloha Vet with Mike Aho for Nat Geo Wild.

References

1968 births
Living people
Australian emigrants to the United States
People from Los Angeles
Australian male television actors
People educated at Newington College